List of plant species in the genus Arabis. The genus contains over 100 accepted species, spread across North America, Europe, North Africa and Asia. Many species previously included in Arabis have since been moved to other genera such as Boechera.

Key

Species

Hybrid species

See also

External links 
 Arabis genus at the Global Biodiversity Information Facility

 
Arabis